Christine Watkins (born 1950) is an American politician serving in the Utah House of Representatives, representing District 69.

Early life and career
Watkins lives in Carbon County. Her husband was a city councilman in Castle Dale. She has a B.S. in Elementary Education from Utah State University, three Special Education Endorsements from BYU, and a Master's of Educational Leadership from the University of Utah. Watkins served on the Castle Dale City Planning and Zoning board, and also held leadership positions in the Emery Education Association.  She served as the executive director for the Southeastern Utah UniServ.

Political career
Prior to the 2018 election, Watkins had served a total of six years in the Utah House of Representatives: from 2009 through 2012, and again from 2017 to the present. 
After losing her bid for reelection in 2012, she switched party affiliation from the Democratic Party to the Republican Party.
In 2016, she defeated Democratic Incumbent Brad King.  In 2018, Rep. Watkins ran as the Republican incumbent serving a two-year term that began on Jan. 1, 2017, and defeated Democratic challenger Tim Glenn.

During the 2022 General Session, Watkins served on the Business, Economic Development, and Labor Appropriations Subcommittee, House Education Committee, and
House Natural Resources, Agriculture, and Environment Committee.

See also
 List of American politicians who switched parties in office

Notable legislation
2022- Representative Watkins ran HB 166 which modifies criminal and civil provisions related to water facilities, including defining terms, repealing language, and amending criminal intent provisions; clarifies award of attorney fees and costs; and addresses scope of the section. The bill passed unanimously out of the House Natural Resources, Agriculture, and Environment Committee, and would go on to pass unanimously as well on the House floor, Senate committee, and Senate floor. 

2022- Representative Watkins ran HB 292 which amends the 2018 edition of the International Fire Code to provide an exemption from the Type 1 hood requirement for a cooking appliance in a permitted microenterprise home kitchen. The bill passed unanimously in the House Political Subdivisions Committee, House floor, Senate Economic Development and Workforce Services Committee, and Senate floor.

2022 sponsored legislation

References

Living people
1950 births
Women state legislators in Utah
Members of the Utah House of Representatives
Utah Republicans
Utah Democrats
21st-century American politicians
21st-century American women politicians